Gianello is an Italian surname. Notable people with the surname include:

Dante Gianello (1912–1992), French cyclist
Matteo Gianello (born 1976), Italian footballer

See also
Gianelli

Italian-language surnames